Bruce David Beck (born September 18, 1956) is the lead sports anchor at WNBC. He is in his 25th year with News 4 New York. He is also the host of Sports Final, WNBC's popular Sunday night sports show. Beck is the host and sideline reporter for New York Giants pre-season football. In November 2021, Broadcasting & Cable honored Bruce as the top local sports anchor in America. 

The sportscaster has covered a multitude of events for News 4 New York, including 5 Super Bowls, 3 NBA Finals, 6 Stanley Cup Finals, 7 World Series, The U.S. Open Tennis Championship, The U.S. Open Golf Championship, and The NCAA Final Four. In addition, Beck has covered 9 Olympics, with the most recent being the 2020 Tokyo Olympics 

Beck has hosted and contributed to a number of WNBC-TV specials including the live broadcast of the New York City Marathon, The Belmont Stakes, The U.S. Open Golf Championship and "Deja Blue", which preceded Super Bowl XLVI.

In addition, Beck has hosted the Sun America Sportsdesk and the Allstate Sports Update for NBC Sports and has served as a sideline reporter for the network's coverage of the NBA and WNBA on NBC. Beck has been a studio anchor for NBA-TV and is the host of the weekly Rutgers University basketball and football shows which air on MSG Network. He was one of the first play by play voices for the Ultimate Fighting Championship (UFC) from 1994 to 1997.

Career
From 1982 to 1994, Beck was a staff broadcaster with the MSG Network. Among his many duties, he hosted the station's coverage of the Knicks, Rangers, and Yankees. He was the play-by-play announcer for college football and basketball, professional and Golden Gloves boxing and professional tennis. He hosted the Millrose Games, The Virginia Slims Championship, The National Horse Show, and the Lou Carnesecca Show.

From 1994 to 1997, Beck hosted "Sportstalk" and "Sports Images" on CN8, the Comcast Network. He also was the play-by-play voice of Atlantic 10 Conference Basketball and Hofstra University Football, while calling college basketball games for CBS Sports. He was the host of CBS' coverage of the Hambletonian and The American Championship Harness Series on ESPN. He was a play-by-play voice and host of Showtime Championship Boxing.

Beck was the play by play announcer for the Ultimate Fighting Championship from 1994 to 1997, calling UFC 4 through UFC 15 with partner and olympic gold medalist Jeff Blatnick.

Beck was hired by WNBC-TV in 1997 as the weekend sports anchor and weekday reporter. He became the lead sports anchor in 2009.

From 2000 to 2008, Beck was a studio anchor for NBA TV.

Beck began calling professional boxing in 1986 with MSG Network. He currently calls fights for ESPN+ and Top Rank Boxing.

Beck has also called the blow by blow for USA Network, Showtime Championship Boxing, and numerous international broadcasts. Most notably, Beck manned the headset for Evander Holyfield vs. Mike Tyson II on June 28, 1997.

From 2011 to 2013, Beck handled blow by blow duties for Epix (TV network). In 2015, he called the action for HBO2's boxing presentation from Macau. In 2016, Beck handled some blow by blow duties for Spike TV's Premier Boxing Champions and for Spike's Bellator Kickboxing.

Awards
In November of 2021, Broadcasting & Cable honored Beck as the top local sports anchor in America.
 
Beck has also been named New York State Sportscaster of the Year 9 times, including six years in a row from 2007 until 2012, by the National Sports Media Association. In the 1990s, Beck was twice named New Jersey Sportscaster of the Year.

Beck received the 2006 New York Emmy as Outstanding Sports Anchor. In 2011, Beck won a New York Sports Emmy for his interview with former Rutgers football player Eric Legrand. Overall, he has received eight New York Sports Emmys, one Mid-Atlantic Sports Emmy and three national Cable Ace Awards.

In 2017, Ithaca College honored Beck with the Jessica Savitch Award of Distinction for Excellence in Journalism.

Beck was chosen by St. John's University to deliver the 2009 Commencement speech to its Staten Island Campus on May 16. He received an Honorary Doctor of Letters Degree.

Bruce was inducted into the MetroWest Jewish Sports Hall of Fame in 2008.

Personal life
Beck grew up in Livingston, New Jersey, where his mother Doris Beck twice served as mayor. She was the first female mayor of any Essex County municipality. He was a student athlete at Livingston High School. He graduated from high school in 1974 and was inducted into the school's hall of fame in 1993.

A graduate of Ithaca College in Ithaca, New York, Beck received a Bachelor of Science degree in 1978.

Bruce and his wife, Janet, currently reside in Westchester County, New York. The Becks have two sons, Jonathan and Michael, two daughters-in-law, Jordana and Calie and four grandchildren.

Each Thanksgiving, Beck and his family serve those in need at the St. John's Bread and Life Program, the largest soup kitchen in Brooklyn. In 2015, the Becks received the Johnny's Angel Award for their work in the St. John's community.

Starting in 2017, Beck launched the Bruce Beck Sports Broadcasting Camp at Iona College in New Rochelle, New York. Beck, along with the top sportscasters and personalities in New York, teaches the fundamentals of the industry to the next generation of sports broadcasters. The camp concludes at Yankee Stadium, with kids calling the play-by-play of a live Yankees game.

Every summer from 2002 to 2016, Beck, along with CBS Sports announcer Ian Eagle ran a similar camp at the Yogi Berra Museum and Learning Center in Montclair, New Jersey.

Beck is notorious for his insistence on using team aliases during his reports. These include Bronx Bombers (Yankees), Amazins' (Mets), Gang Green (Jets), Big Blue (Giants), and Blueshirts (Rangers). His signature catchphrase is "One for the Ages".

References

External links
 Bruce Beck & Ian Eagle Sports Sports Broadcasting Camp
 NBA TV Talent: Bruce Beck
 Can Someone Make Sense of Marbury's Interview?

Women's college basketball announcers in the United States
College basketball announcers in the United States
College football announcers
National Football League announcers
20th-century American Jews
American television journalists
Television anchors from New York City
Tennis commentators
National Hockey League broadcasters
Major League Baseball broadcasters
New York (state) television reporters
Mixed martial arts broadcasters
Boxing commentators
Ithaca College alumni
National Basketball Association broadcasters
American reporters and correspondents
Living people
Livingston High School (New Jersey) alumni
People from Livingston, New Jersey
People from Scarsdale, New York
1956 births
New York Knicks announcers
New York Rangers announcers
New York Yankees announcers
New York Giants announcers
American male journalists
21st-century American Jews